The 1994 Tokyo Indoor also known as "Seiko Super Tennis" was a men's tennis tournament played on indoor carpet courts in Tokyo, Japan that was part of the  IBM 1994 ATP Tour and was an ATP Championship Series event. The tournament was held from 10 October through 16 October 1994. Matches were the best of three sets. First-seeded Goran Ivanišević won the singles title.

Finals

Singles

 Goran Ivanišević defeated  Michael Chang 6–4, 6–4
 It was Ivanišević' 2nd singles title of the year and the 11th of his career.

Doubles

 Grant Connell /  Patrick Galbraith defeated  Byron Black /  Jonathan Stark 6–3, 3–6, 6–4

References

External links
 ITF tournament edition details

Tokyo Indoor
Tokyo Indoor
Tokyo Indoor